The numero sign or numero symbol, №, (also represented as Nº, No,  No. or no.), is a typographic abbreviation of the word number(s) indicating ordinal numeration, especially in names and titles.

Typographically, the numero sign combines as a single ligature the uppercase Latin letter  with a usually superscript lowercase letter , sometimes underlined, resembling the masculine ordinal indicator . The ligature has a code point in Unicode as a precomposed character, .

In Romance languages, the numero sign is understood as an abbreviation of the word for "number", e.g. Italian , French , and Portuguese and Spanish .

This article describes other typographical abbreviations for "number" in different languages, in addition to the numero sign proper.

Usages
The numero sign as a single glyph, despite its widespread usage internationally, is not a standard keyboard symbol in virtually any European language. A capital or lower-case "n" may be used, followed by "o.", superscript "o", ordinal indicator, or the degree sign; this will be understood in most languages.

Bulgarian

English
In English, the non-ligature form  is typical and is often used to abbreviate the word "number". In North America, the number sign, is more prevalent. The ligature form does not appear on British or American QWERTY keyboards.

French
The numero symbol is not in common use in France and does not appear on a standard AZERTY keyboard. Instead, the French Imprimerie nationale recommends the use of the form "no" (an "n" followed by a superscript lowercase "o"). The plural form "nos" can also be used. In practice, the "o" is often replaced by the degree symbol (°), which is visually similar to the superscript "o" and is easily accessible on an AZERTY keyboard.

Indonesian and Malaysian
"Nomor" in Indonesian and "nombor" in Malaysian; therefore "No." is commonly used as an abbreviation with standard spelling and full stop.

Italian

The sign is usually replaced with the abbreviations "n." or "nº", the latter using a masculine  ordinal indicator, rather than a superscript "O".

Philippines
Because of more than three centuries of Spanish colonisation, the word número is found in almost all Philippine languages. "No." is its common notation in local languages as well as English.

Portuguese
In Portugal the notation "n.º" is often used, as in Spain. In Brazil, where Portuguese is the official language, "nº" is often used on official documents.

Russian
Although the letter  is not in the Cyrillic alphabet, the numero sign  is typeset in Russian publishing, and is available on Russian computer and typewriter keyboards.

The numero sign is very widely used in Russia and other post-Soviet states in many official and casual contexts. Examples include usage for law and other official documents numbering, names of institutions (hospitals, kindergartens, schools, libraries, organization departments and so on), numbering of periodical publications (such as newspapers and magazines), numbering of public transport routes, etc.

"№ п/п" ("sequential number") is universally used as a table header to denote a column containing the table row number.

The № sign is sometimes used in Russian medical prescriptions (which according to the law must be written in Latin language) as an abbreviation for the Latin word numero to indicate the number of prescribed dosages (for example, tablets or capsules), and on the price tags in drugstores and pharmacy websites to indicate number of unit doses in drug packages, although the standard abbreviation for use in prescriptions is the Latin

Spanish
The numero sign is not typically used in Iberian Spanish, and it is not present on standard keyboard layouts. According to the Real Academia Española and the Fundéu BBVA, the word número (number) is abbreviated per the Spanish typographic convention of letras voladas ("flying letters"). The first letter(s) of the word to be abbreviated are followed by a period; then, the final letter(s) of the word are written as lowercase superscripts. This gives the abbreviations n.o (singular) and n.os (plural). The abbreviation "no." is not used, because it might be mistaken for the Spanish word no (no, not). Furthermore, nro. and núm. are also acceptable abbreviations for número. The numero sign either as a one-character symbol (№) or composed of the letter N plus the superscript "o" character (sometimes underlined or substituted by ordinal indicator º) is common in Latin America, where the interpolated period is sometimes not used in abbreviations.

Nr.
In some languages, Nr., nr., nr or NR is used instead, reflecting the abbreviation of the language's word for "number". German  is represented this way, and this language capitalises all nouns and abbreviations of nouns. It is most commonly lowercase in other languages, such as Dutch, Danish, Norwegian, Polish, Romanian, Estonian and Swedish. Some languages, such as Polish, omit the dot in abbreviations, if the last letter of the original word is present in the abbreviation.

Typing the symbol
On typewriters and computers that do not support this symbol, it is acceptable and commonplace to replace it with the trigraph "No." (letter "N", letter "o", and a period (full stop)).

On typewriters and computers that support the degree symbol  a digraph "N°" may be used. If the masculine ordinal indicator is available, the better digraph "Nº" may be used. These result in a passable approximation of the numero sign, but a consistent notation must be used in digital data which must be searchable.

On Russian computer keyboard layout, the № character is available and often located on the  key.

In macOS, the character can be typed using "U.S. Extended" and "Irish Extended" keyboard layouts by typing .  As of macOS 10.13, this combination does not yield the numero symbol when "U.S." or "U.S. International" is chosen.  It will only yield the numero symbol when "ABC – Extended" is chosen as the input keyboard.

Alternatively standard XIM style can be used:  then .

In Microsoft Windows and HTML in general, the numero sign can be entered by the Unicode input methods &#8470; or &#x2116;.

Technical considerations

See also 
Superior letter

References

External links 
 Unicode Letterlike Symbols code chart

Typographical symbols
Numbers